Gotham, was a New York City horn funk-rock band from the early 1970s.

Personnel 
Vocals
 Schuyler "Sky" I. Ford (1947–2001)
Saxophone
 Frank Vicari
 Pee Wee Ellis
Trumpet
 John Eckert
 John Gatchell
Rhythm section
 Chris Qualles - bass
 Linc Chamberland - guitar
 Jimmy Strassburg - drums

Albums
 Pass The Butter  (1972) 
 Tom Wilson, producer. Recorded at MoWest Studios, Los Angeles, California
 Sittin' on a Mountain
 Ease My Mind 
 Why Doesn't the Sun Shine 
 Behind the Wall
 Use It Or Lose It
 Window Pane
 Moon
 They Made Me An Outlaw
 Daddy Left Home
 Talkin' 'Bout
 Gettin' High

External links
 Gotham MySpace Page
 Horn Rock Heaven

American pop music groups